Șoimari is a commune in Prahova County, Muntenia, Romania. It is composed of three villages: Lopatnița, Măgura and Șoimari.

References

Communes in Prahova County
Localities in Muntenia